The M104 155 mm projectile is a chemical artillery shell designed for use by the U.S. Army. As early as the 1960s, the shell was also filled with white phosphorus to be used for obscuration and signaling.

History and design
Following World War I, militaries around the world began working to standardize calibers of ammunition within their countries.  In the United States, the military began focusing on replacing the European-made 75 mm artillery shells with 105 mm and 155 mm shells.

The M104 (along with the M110, which it shares many design elements with) was designed as a 155 mm artillery shell for use in the M114 howitzer.  It is a   steel shell with a rotating band near the base, and a burster well that goes down the center of the shell.  Filler of either sulfur mustard or white phosphorus is placed in the empty space and a fuze is fixed to the top before firing.

Variants and markings

Projectile, gas, persistent, HD, 155 mm howitzer, M104
This version of the shell was designed as a chemical weapon delivery system. It is marked as a standard chemical artillery munition, being gray with two green, horizontal bands.

The United States Army still possesses a limited stockpile of these munitions, which are in the process of being safely decommissioned in accordance with the 1997 Chemical Weapons Convention.

Projectile, smoke, WP, 155 mm gun, M104
Due to the properties of white phosphorus, the shell also has mild incendiary effects. It is marked as a military smoke munition, being gray with a single yellow, horizontal band.

See also
 M110 155 mm projectile
 M121 155 mm projectile
 M687 155 mm projectile

References

155mm artillery shells
Chemical weapon delivery systems
Chemical weapons of the United States